Tony McRae may refer to:

 Tony McRae (politician) (born 1957), Australian politician
 Tony McRae (American football) (born 1993), American football cornerback